Sharon Fordham is an American Broadway theatrical producer, entrepreneur, venture capitalist, and angel investor.

Overview
Sharon is a producer of Jill Santoriello's Broadway musical adaptation of 'A Tale of Two Cities' opening for preview on August 19, 2008 at the Al Hirschfeld Theatre in New York.

In addition to her work as a Broadway producer, Sharon is an angel investor and Principal of The Fordham Group, an early investment company focusing on investments in the technology area.

Previously, she was CEO and board member of WeightWatchers.com, Inc., Recently, WeightWatchers.com was bought by the licensor, Weight Watchers International.

Prior to her time as CEO of WeightWatchers.com, Sharon held several executive positions at Nabisco, including President of Global e-Business, President of the LifeSavers Company (Nabisco subsidiary) and Senior Vice President of marketing for Nabisco's flagship division, the Nabisco Biscuit Company.

While at Nabisco, Sharon pioneered the emerging advertising genre of "advergaming", with the launch of Nabisco's gaming web sites, Candystand.com and Nabiscoworld.com.

Production credits
A Tale of Two Cities

Education
Sharon earned a bachelor's degree from Douglass College at Rutgers University and an MBA from the Wharton School of Business at the University of Pennsylvania.

References

Rutgers University alumni
Wharton School of the University of Pennsylvania alumni
Living people
American women chief executives
Year of birth missing (living people)
21st-century American women